The Asian Indoor Athletics Championships is a biennial event which began in 2004. Asian Athletics Association accepts only athletes who are representing one of the organisation's Asian member states and the body recognises records set at editions of the Asian Indoor Athletics Championships.

Men

Women

Records in defunct events

Men's events

Women's events

References

Records
Asian Indoor Athletics Championships
Asian Indoor Championships